The Shongweni Dam and Nature Reserve is located in Durban, KwaZulu-Natal. It was established in 1927 and consists of 17 thousand hectares of nature reserve.

The Reserve is eutrophic in nature and is home to a range of wildlife including, but not limited to buffalo, giraffe, wildebeest and more than 250 species of birds. The Shongweni Dam and Nature Reserve is used for both tourism and trade given its diverse wildlife, and physical activities such as canoeing and game viewing. 

The Umlazi River which originates from the south west of Pietermaritzburg flows through Baynesfield and Mapstone Dam, Thornlea Dam before reaching Shongweni Dam.

See also 

 List of dams in South Africa
 List of nature reserves in eThekwini

References 

Dams in South Africa
Dams completed in 1927